Bradley David Goddard (born May 17, 1977) is a Canadian actor.

Early life and education
Goddard was born in Lucan, Ontario. His identical twin brother, Chris Goddard, is also an actor. Goddard studied theatre at the University of Waterloo. By the end of his study at Waterloo, he had appeared in 26 productions and had taught the University's Drama Department First Year acting course for three years.

Career 
After moving to Toronto, Ontario Goddard joined Skye Management and landed the role of Carter Travis alongside his twin brother Chris in the role of Cody Travis in the MTV series Undressed. Goddard then worked on the Canadian theatre premiere of The Laramie Project (2003), as well as an equally successful 2004 remount.

Goddard's next project was hosting a home improvement show with his brother Chris on OLN (Outdoor Life Network) called The Outhouse. The show was entirely improvised, and pitted the twins against each other in two separate exterior home renovations over the course of two days. The Outhouse won Bronze at WorldFest for "Best Reality-Based Programme"

Since moving to Calgary, Alberta, Goddard landed a principal role in Decoys 2 (now titled Decoys 2: Alien Seduction) as "Nick Dean".

Goddard is also the director of sales for Big Rock Brewery.

Filmography

Film

Television

See also
 List of University of Waterloo people

References

External links

Studio 180
Peace Point Entertainment The Outhouse page
Worldfest release

1977 births
Canadian male film actors
Canadian male television actors
Living people
Identical twin male actors
Canadian twins